Box Reef is a line of drying rocks lying between Esplin Islands and League Rock, off the south end of Adelaide Island. The name, given by the UK Antarctic Place-Names Committee in 1963 in association with nearby Cox Reef, derives from Box and Cox, the well-known English literary allusion to a pair of individuals who occupied the same lodgings alternately day and night without knowledge of each other.

References
 

Reefs of Adelaide Island